Calabanga, officially the Municipality of Calabanga, is a 1st class municipality in the province of Camarines Sur, Philippines. According to the 2020 census, it has a population of 88,906 people.

History

In 1578 when the head Mission of Quipayo was established, Calabanga was only a visita or barrio. At that time, the place had vast forests and swamps and an abundance of wildlife such as monkeys, wild chickens, and forest lizard. Others say, it derived its name from the Bicol word “Calabangan”, the plural term of “labang” or “litag”, meaning a kind of snare for catching wild animals. Another legend says that Calabanga originated from the word “Calagbangan” meaning the wide, long, and straight street spanning from the church through the poblacion, east to west, called locally as “calabaan” or “calacbangan”.

Calabanga became known with 400 tributes. On July 15, 1749, it was separated from Quipayo by virtue of the approval of Don Fray Joan de Arechera, Bishop Elect of Nueva Segovia of the Commissary of the King, in the petition signed & filed by 37 Calabangueños on April 28, 1749, for town to be conveniently administered.

There were 2 visitas, visita de Cagapad and visita de hinarijan and 12 barrios. The barrios were san Antonio, San Vicente, Santa Catalina, Nuestra Señora de Salud, San Lucas, San Miguel, Santa Isabel, Nuestra Señora del Carmen, San Roque, San Pablo, San Jose (now Balongay) and Belen.

Calabanga is one of the municipalities of the province of Camarines Sur and a member of the Metro Naga Development Council. With its fishing grounds and the vast agricultural area, it is a major supplier of fish and other marine products and prime agricultural products in the province as well as in Metro Manila.

Quipayo or Calabanga used to own Tinambak (Tinambac), Masirum (Siruma), Bombon, Magarao, Cabusao, and Piglabanan (Libmanan). Libmanan is the oldest that was established in 1580 while Bombon was the last being separated which was created in 1949.

Cityhood

Attaining a steady progress through time, the fishing town is now preparing to be the next chartered city in the province of Camarines Sur. This is through the Executive Order No. 25, Series of 2021 on October 25, 2021, which created the "Calabanga Cityhood Committee" headed by Mayor Eduardo A. Severo. Calabanga will be known as "The sardine capital of Bicol". If so Calabanga will be the 4th city in Camarines Sur after Naga, Iriga and Pili.

Geography

It is bounded on the west by the Bicol River and beyond the municipality of Cabusao; on the south by the municipality of Bombon and Naga City; on the east by the forest lands of Mount Isarog, the Tigman River and each tributary forming the natural boundary and beyond the municipality of Tinambac; on the north by the fishing grounds of San Miguel Bay, and beyond, the municipalities of Sipocot, Basud and Mercedes.

Calabanga is divided into six areas: 

 West Coast
 Harbour
 East Coast
 Poblacion
 Highland
 Quipayo

Topography and slope

The topographic landscape of the municipality could be characterized as generally flat with a slope 0-3%, gently sloping (3-8%) towards the direction of the eastern portion and finally rolling up to higher steeps towards the direction of the south-eastern part going to Mt. Isarog. The 0-3% slope is a broad area of flat to nearly level land which extends from Barangay Balongay along the Bicol River to Poblacion area and surrounding areas down to Barangay Manguiring. This is the dominant slope of the municipality.

Soil and water resources

There are six soil types that could be found in the Municipality. These are the (1) Hydrosol which is dominant along the Bicol River covering parts of Barangays Balongay, San Bernardino and Punta Tarawal; (2) Balong Clay; (3) Pili Clay Loam;  (4) Tigaon Clay which covers the poblacion; (5) Annan Clay Loam which could be found toward the direction of Tinambac and (6) Mountain Soil in the Mt. Isarog area.

The municipality of Calabanga is endowed with abundant natural resources. The major river systems, the Tigman, Hinaguianan and Inarihan rivers are presently utilized for irrigation purposes. They originate their main tributaries from Mt. Isarog and flow down in the north-western direction ultimately discharging the flow to San Miguel Bay.

Calabanga is blessed with many natural spring water resources found in the eastern portion of the municipality along the north-western flanks of Mt. Isarog. Most of these are found to be potential sources for potable water supply of the municipality, aside from the Hamislag and Tawang rivers.

Calabanga is bounded by water bodies, the San Miguel Bay on the northern part and the Bikol River on the western part which are sources of abundant supplies of fish of various species and other marine products.

Land use

With its generally flat terrain, the dominant land use is agricultural. The built-up areas and major rivers have the smallest portion of the total area. Built-up areas are clustered within the urban barangays. The urban areas expand in an almost linear development or ribbon like development pattern.

Proposed land use as embodied in the comprehensive land use plan has delineated the residential, commercial, institutional area within the urban land use while the agricultural, agro-industrial, special use could be found in the general land use.

Barangays

Calabanga is politically subdivided into 48 barangays, fourteen of which are within the urban area while the remaining 34 barangays belong to the rural areas. It has 11 coastal barangays and 3 highly urbanized barangays.

Climate

Demographics

In the 2000 NCSO Survey, Calabanga had a total population of 67,408 with 25,159 or 37.32% belong to the urban population and 42,249 or 62.68% belong to the rural population. There was an increase of 8,244 over the 1995 population. The total population is distributed over 12,444 households, registering an increase of 1,371 households over the 1995 household of 11,073. The average household size in 2000 survey slightly goes up to 5.4 from 5.3 persons in 1995.

Between 1995 and 2000, Calabanga grew at the rate of 2.83%, higher than the 1990-1995 rate of 1.63%. As per the 2010 census, the municipal population density is 477 persons per km2.

Of the 48 barangays in the municipality, Barangay San Roque has the largest population of 5,513 people, composing 7.38% of the total population, followed by Barangay Santa Cruz Ratay with a population of 5,069 people. Barangay Punta Tarawal has the lowest population of 265 which only 0.44% of the total population.

Despite the influx of various religious groups, a large segment which is 95.28% of the populace is still Roman Catholics. Most of the populace, 95.93% are Bicolano speaking.

Isarog Agta language
In 2010, UNESCO released its 3rd world volume of Endangered Languages in the World, where 3 critically endangered languages were in the Philippines. One of these languages in the Isarog Agta language which has an estimated speaker of 5 people in the year 2000. The language was classified as Critically Endangered, meaning the youngest speakers are grandparents and older, and they speak the language partially and infrequently and hardly pass the language to their children and grandchildren anymore. If the remaining 150 people do not pass their native language to the next generation of Isarog Agta people, their indigenous language will be extinct within a period of 1 to 2 decades.

The Isarog Agta people live within the circumference of Mount Isarog, though only 5 of them still know their indigenous language. They are one of the original Negrito settlers in the entire Philippines. They belong to the Aeta people classification, but have distinct language and belief systems unique to their own culture and heritage.

Urbanization

Calabanga, just of Naga City is rapidly urbanizing town with new infrastructures under construction in the Poblacion as well as the rural areas. It is the fourth most competitive town in Camarines Sur. The reason why the town is rapidly urbanizing it's because people from the towns of Tinambac Bombon Siruma come there to work and study and another reason why is that it's proximity to Naga City and also being part of the Metropolitan.

Economy 

Calabanga is the fifth largest commercial center in Camarines Sur next to Pili, followed by Libmanan and the 11th largest commercial center in Bicol Region next to Polangui and followed by Nabua. It became a 1st class municipality in October of 2009. 

Calabanga is blessed with rich natural resources. It has big uplands and vast fishing grounds. Agricultural areas are the most extensive areas covering more than half of the total land area in this municipality. It is the dominant land use. Land devoted to crop production is approximately 7,609.79 has. Which include rice, corn and coconut as the major crops and other crops such as abaca, coffee, vegetables, rootcrops and fruit trees.

Side by side with agriculture, fishing and livestock raising constitutes major economic activities. The fish grounds of San Miguel Bay as well as the Bikol River are the rich sources of plentiful fish, shellfish, oysters, capiz shells, prawns, shrimps and other marine species providing various livelihood industries such as fish processing, fish paste and bagoong making and other marine by-product. These marine by-products as well as shrimps, prawn, mudcrabs are supplied to the city of Naga, other neighboring provinces as well as in Manila. Other water sources include Inarihan, Tigman and Hinaguinan river aside from the fishponds for the brackish and freshwater species.

Livestock raising is a thriving industry in the municipality, an inventory of livestock and poultry farms shows that there are 5 commercial piggery and 3 commercial poultry farms operating in the municipality aside from the backyard animal raising which is very common in rural areas.

Next to agriculture and fishing, commerce, trade and industry are important and significant aspects in the economy of the municipality. Commercial and industrial activities are more concentrated in the urban areas that include among others wholesale and retail trade, minor service centers, transport business, community and personal services, drugstores, agri-supplies, gasoline stations while industrial activities include rice milling, fish processing, bamboo craft, furniture making, garments, metal crafts, ice plant, welding and auto repair shops as well as other small enterprises. Nipa shingle production is also one industry predominant at western barangays where nipa swamps could be found. The products are sold not only within the municipality but to nearby towns and Naga City.

The presence of a new Calabanga Public Market which started operation last 1998 finally resolved the demands for a bigger marketing center, while Cooperatives throughout the municipality are gradually developing its enterprises.

Shopping Centers 
The municipality is home to major shopping mall in the region, the LCC Mall Calabanga which is located in the poblacion of the town. Other major establishments in the center of the municipality are CitiTrends, Calabanga Town Center (Which is adjacent to the market), Star Master Plaza, and Angena Supermarket also in the poblacion, and the small Quipayo Community Center which no longer exists today. It is a very promising that it is a progressive town however it still is heavily dependent on Farm and Fishing.

Banks 
 Producer's Bank
 Landbank
 ARDCI Microfinance
 Rural Bank of Calabanga
 SEC Bank
 Bank of the Philippine Islands
 BDO Unibank. Inc
 Union bank

Trade
Calabanga is the center, or at least near the center of San Miguel Bay it is the source of income in the municipalities surrounding San Miguel Bay and also some parts of Camarines Norte particularly Basud and Mercedes. The municipality's economy and population changed dramatically in the past 10–13 years.

Tourism

Calabanga has a quite a number of tourism potentials and attractions. Famous among the scenic beauties are the group of small islets/islands of Kawit, Tanglad, and Cabgan which is a few minutes from the shore. These islands are frequently visited by excursionists particularly during summer but these places need more development. Other places that invite picnickers to its cool and clear water are Tigman, Hinaguianan and Inarihan rivers and private commercial resorts.Historical sites worthy to see is the “Ladrillo” or a brick old church and ruins of Quipayo built sometime in 1578, more than four centuries ago, being the seat of the Catholic mission. Another is the “HINULID”, Santo Entiero shrine at Santa Salud which is an object of Friday devotion and pilgrimage. Thousands of devotees not only from Calabanga but other parts of Bicol Region and the country flock to the shrine during Maundy Thursday and Good Friday.

Calabanga also has apartments and condo buildings along the main street in Poblacion.

Poblacion Economic Zone (PEZ)  

Poblacion Economic Zone is an economic zone in Calabanga between Barangay San Miguel and Santa Cruz Ratay. This area hosts a lot of business establishments ranging from low class eateries to high end restaurants. This is also called the Calabanga Urban Belt. It is often busy in this area. This is where restaurants, churches, parks, stadiums, cockpit arenas, municipal hall, museum, market, malls, banks, financial institution are found.

Calabanga CBD III project 

Just before the National Elections in 2022. The Local Government Unit and the provincial government proposed a project named "Calabanga CBD 3". This was headed by Former Governor Migz Villafuerte and mayor Eduardo Severo. As of August 2022 a road project that stretches from the market to Casureco II is ongoing.
The new CBD has a land of 596,543 m² and will have Condominiums. The new municipal hall, police station, Calabanga high school and college, Calabanga Hospital, and other government buildings and malls will be built there. It is a very ambitious project for the people of Calabanga. The CBD will also have a large park with dining and bars just near the town proper. The New CBD is just adjacent to the market with a new bus terminal that will enhance transportation in the municipality. The Star Master Plaza Mall that is the first building in the CBD and the largest mall in Calabanga is expected to be completed by 2024. The CBD will be fully finished by 15 to 20 years. This project was headed by former Mayor Eduardo Severo with his mission and vision named "AmBisyon natin Calabanga 2040!"

Agriculture

Produces the following products:
 Coconut
 Rice
 Abaca
 Corn

Most people are farmers and fishermen.

Culture
For sports and recreation, the municipality has a covered court at the poblacion area wherein the municipal-wide annual competitions for various sports activities such as basketball, volleyball and other sports are held. However, almost all barangays have multi-purpose play areas which are usually being utilized by the residents especially the youth, as volleyball and basketball courts. There is also a municipal park at the center of the poblacion area where people could spend their time and relax.

Government

Elected officials

Infrastructure

Highways

Calabanga only has one highway that traverses the municipality. It is the Naga North road or widely known as Naga - Siruma road. The highway starts at the boundary of Naga City in the intersection of Bagumbayan St, San Vicente Road and Capilihan St to Amuris Beach in Siruma. 

Other roads are Pagatpat Road or diversion road and Balongay road. 

Speaking of roads there is a new  ongoing project from Casureco II station to the Local Market.

Others 
Calabanga is endowed with abundant water resources. At present, the main source of local water district for potable water supply is from Balombon spring. Its capacity is 10 lps which is able to serve 18 barangays. The areas being served are San Antonio poblacion, Del Carmen, Sta Isabel, San Miguel, San Vicente, Santa Salud, San Lucas, San Pablo, San Francisco, Sta Cruz Poblacion, Paolbo, Manguiring, Balombon, San Roque, San Isidro, Pagatpat, Sabang and Salvacion Baybay. Most of these are in the poblacion areas and the rest are the barangays traversed by the source from Balombon.

For barangays not reach by the services of the Local Water District (Level III), the sources are shallow wells, deep wells and water peddlers. These serve the daily needs of the household for potable water supply.

All the barangays of the municipality are link by road system. The municipality is easily accessible from the City of Naga, Bicol Region's prime city. Most of the total road networks need improvements and rehabilitation to provide greater access to far- flung barangay residents and facilitate hauling and marketing of farm produce to the poblacion/ marketing centers.

For inter-barangay linkages, tricycles abound that could bring one to various barangay while foot pedalled tricycles/ padyak abound within the poblacion areas.
For bus and jeepney parking facilities, there is a privately owned and operated terminal located at San Francisco but the local government has proposed integrated terminal that will be located within the Calabanga Public Market compound that could accommodate almost all jeepneys and tricycles in the municipality.

From Metro Manila, Calabanga is very much accessible via Naga City. First, by a 45-minute plane flight to Naga Airport located at Pili and a car/jeep ride of some 40 minutes to Calabanga. Another choice is a 7–10 hours aircon bus trip direct to Calabanga being provided by three bus lines. The Philippine National Railways (PNR) also provide trips from Manila to Bicol and vice- versa having a station at Naga City, then it takes some 20–30 minutes ride from Naga City to Calabanga.
The power supply in the municipality of Calabanga is provided by the NAPOCOR through the Camarines Sur Electric Cooperative II (CASURECO II). At present, all the 48 barangays of the municipality are already served with electricity, however, few remaining sitios of far-flung barangays are still longing for the extension of power lines to their places. As of 2020 census 99.82% of Calabangueños have access to electricity.

Communication and technology 
The modern technology on Communications and information has far reached the municipality of Calabanga and has provided the constituents with better access to communication.

Calabanga is being served by private telephone companies, the L.M. United Telephone Company (UNITEL) and the BAYANTEL Company which provides individual connections for those at the urban and outlying barangays. These companies provide local and long-distance calls to Metro Manila or any point in the country or any other place where the system can reach. Year 2002, the cellular mobile phone services within the municipality was improved and expanded through the installation of telecommunication facilities such as the cell site by two private telecommunication companies. The Bureau of Telecommunications, a government operated agency having a Telecom Office stationed in the municipality is providing telegraphic services to the residents of Calabanga while Postal services is provided mainly by the Philippine postal corporation.

According to the provincial government of Camarines Sur as of 2021 Calabanga has around 49,356 cellphone users and 30,057 people use internet. 

Naga City TV relay stations as well as the cable TV stations are tuned-in in the municipality while a local cable TV station and a private; local community television station and a newly opened radio station are based in the municipality. Radio broadcasts from several radio stations in Canaman, and Naga City.
Local as well as national newspapers and magazines are available regularly from newsstands and newsboys from Naga City.

Internet 

Calabanga's main source of Internet is Converge which is owned by the government. However some households use PLDT, Globe Internet, Smart Bro, Talk N' Text Wifi and other private network companies.

Environment Protection

Land Protection 
Eastern Calabanga which supplies water to the municipality and is within Mount Isarog, was declared as a protected landscape in 2018 by Former Mayor Eduardo Severo. Meaning no one should build houses or any establishments there. Subdivisions also cannot be built in the irrigated areas of Calabanga. This law was made through Republic act 56 series of 2015.

Water Protection 
A lot of fishing accidents have happened in San Miguel Bay. These incidents include people from the Coastal Barangays of Calabanga  throw their trash and feces in the bay. 1 fisherman killed tons of fishes using chemicals in 2016 and was arrested due to the incidence. So in 2017 the Municipal Government signed the Republic act 24 series of 2017 which says people cannot throw feces and garbage in the bay of San Miguel. The Republic act is in order to keep the water safe and clean.

Healthcare
Health facilities available are 24 private clinics (Medical & Dental), 7 Main and Rural Health Centers and 15 Pharmacies.

The number of health personnel is sufficient and beyond standard as to the ratio to the population, however, facilities and equipment are lacking which are compounded with the dilapidated main health center.

With the social welfare services devolved to the LGU as mandated under RA 7160, which is the Local Government Code of 1991, the municipality of Calabanga have assumed the responsibility of implementing the various programs such as the Child and Youth Welfare, Family and Community Organizing, Women's Welfare, Elderly and Disabled persons. Other services include family life education and counseling, Aid to individuals in Crisis Situation and emergency assistance which have the most number of clienteles. The municipality was able to establish and maintain 62-Day Care Centers located at 48 barangays.

For protective services, Barangay Tanod and Lupon Tagapamayapa were organized in every barangay and afforded appropriate training to help in keeping and maintaining peace and order and in setting disputes within and among barangay residents.

A new public municipal hospital will be constructed in Santa Cruz Ratay. This project is expected to start in Mid 2023. This will not only benefit people of Calabanga but also surrounding small towns.

Education

For education, the municipality has a high rate literacy which is attributed to the continuing efforts of the government to make education more accessible to the people. This is being maintained and improved through the 34 public elementary schools located in 32 places and 8 public secondary schools throughout the municipality aside from several private schools offering pre-school, grade school and high school. A college education and technical /vocational courses is being offered by two government-owned institutions the Calabanga Community College (formed under the administration of then Mayor Ruben B. Medroso) and The Central Bicol State University of Agriculture (Calabanga Campus) and privately owned computer schools.

The literacy rate in the municipality is high at 98.5%. The NSO survey in year 2000 for household population, 5 years old and over in terms of educational attainment, reflects the following; of the total population, 29,555 are in the elementary grade; 15,037 are in high school; only 2,623 or 0.045% of the population has no grade completed. 4, 446 are college under graduates with 1,057 degree holders and 201 with post baccalaureate degrees.

There are 38 public elementary schools in the entire municipality; eight high schools; one vocational and some five private schools that offer pre-school, grade school and high school. College education is being offered by two government- owned institutions, the Calabanga Community College and the Central Bicol State University of Agriculture (formerly : CSSAC - Calabanga Campus and privately owned computer Schools, one of which offer a multi- grade schooling from elementary to college levels (Malayan Computer College). (edited last Dec. 3, 2009 by Gilbert Caganda).

Sister Towns and Cities

Local 
 Tinambac Since 1988
 Cabusao Since 1999
 Bombon Since 2000
 Siruma Since 2017
 Libmanan Since 2013
 Mercedes,  Camarines Norte Since 2015
 Pili Since 1980
 Mariveles, Bataan Since 2016
 Legazpi, Albay Since 2007
 Sipocot Since 2010
 Lucena, Quezon Since 2019
 Pasig City Since 2001

International 

 San Leandro, California Since 2017
 Tuaran, Sabah Since 2018
 Depok Since 2012

References

External links

 [ Philippine Standard Geographic Code]
Philippine Census Information

Municipalities of Camarines Sur
Metro Naga